The Saint Paul Open Invitational, which played as the Saint Paul Open from 1930 to 1956, and as the Minnesota Golf Classic from 1966 to 1969, was a PGA Tour event played at Keller Golf Course in St. Paul, Minnesota from 1930–1966 and 1968, at Hazeltine National Golf Club in Chaska, Minnesota in 1967, and at Braemar Golf Course in Edina, Minnesota in 1969.

Winners

References

Former PGA Tour events
Golf in Minnesota
Sports in Minneapolis–Saint Paul
Recurring sporting events established in 1930
Recurring events disestablished in 1969
1930 establishments in Minnesota
1969 disestablishments in Minnesota